Extended Play is the fifth studio album by East Coast hip hop producer Statik Selektah. The album was released on June 18, 2013, by Duck Down Music Inc. and Showoff Records. The album features guest appearances from Action Bronson, Tony Touch, Raekwon, Joey Badass, Black Thought, N.O.R.E., Sean Price, Mac Miller, Mike Posner, Freddie Gibbs, Prodigy, Styles P, Bun B, Hit-Boy, Joell Ortiz, Evidence, Lecrae, Talib Kweli, and Flatbush Zombies among others.

Singles
The first single "Bird's Eye View" featuring Raekwon, Joey Badass and Black Thought was released on April 16, 2013. The second single "21 & Over" featuring Mac Miller and Sean Price was released on May 14, 2013. On June 5, 2013, the music video was released for "21 & Over" featuring Mac Miller and Sean Price. The third single "Game Break" featuring Lecrae, Termanology and Posdnuos was released on June 4, 2013. On September 28, 2013, the music video was released for "Gz, Pimps, Hustlers" featuring Wais P.

Critical response

Extended Play received positive reviews from music critics. At Metacritic, which assigns a weighted mean rating out of 100 to reviews from mainstream critics, the album received an average score of 83, based on 5 reviews, which indicates "universal acclaim". Jason Lymangrover of AllMusic said, "Turntable scratching and a glaring lack of digital manipulation make this feel more like a throwback, but despite the fact that this is the fifth album completed in six years, Statik Selektah's Extended Play doesn't seem sloppily thrown together. Instead, it's a dense, imaginative outing that pays tribute to classic East Coast hip-hop lovingly." Mark Bozzer of Exclaim! stated, "Extended Play easily warrants repeated listens in the whip. Hands down, the best track is lead single "Bird's Eye View," which has the venerable Raekwon and "top 5 MC of all time" Black Thought spitting knowledge with young gun Joey Bada$$ over Seleketah's shimmering soul. Other tracks that stand out are (believe or not) are "21 & Over," which finds Sean P linking with Mac Miller, and testosterone-fest "Funeral Season," featuring Styles P, Bun B and Hit Boy shitting on everybody in their way. Do yourself a favor and cop this release. Rap is good nowadays, so indulge."

Jay Balfour of HipHopDX said, "Extended Play reads much like Statik’s past full-length showcase records—this is the fifth of its kind since 2007—but with 18 tracks and a whopping 38 guests, some of whom make more than one appearance, it’s an inherently tiring listen. At just over 60 minutes, the album is too dense to let the feature production breathe much on its own, and the three separate guest verses per song template dominates much of the project. While the album might incite a little listener’s fatigue in a single session absorption, it functions well as an inspiringly crowded display case of quality Rap in 2013. Statik’s individual partnerships might yield more compelling full-length projects on their own but albums like Extended Play are fine platforms for a little showing off. Matthew Sanderson of AllHipHop stated, "All in all the effort is solid. However, with such a roster of ill MCs, there seems to be some lack luster spitters that should not be on the same track as the others. Almost feels like a little bit of filler. Maybe Statik is trying to shed some limelight to his buddies and I cannot be against that. However, for example, I rather have had extra bars from both the Ghost and Bun on Funeral session, if you get my drift. The beats are there, the greats are on there too. Why not have the All Stars rap the whole piece and X out the gold string?" Steve 'Flash' Juon of RapReviews gave the album a 7.5 out of 10, saying "Extended Play has the comfortable feel of a mid-to-late 1990s DJ Premier P-P-P-Premier mixtape though so I'm not mad at it - I just want Statik to knock his next one out of the stratosphere."

Commercial performance
The album debuted at number 121 on the Billboard 200 chart, with first-week sales of 3,600 copies in the United States.

Track listing
All tracks produced by Statik Selektah except track 16, co-produced by The Alchemist.

Personnel
Credits for Extended Play adapted from AllMusic.

Managerial

Statik Selektah – executive producer
Alvin Akinti – promoter
Guy Belloch – marketing
Matt Blakely – marketing
Buckshot – associate executive producer
Matt Conaway – publicity
DJ Sherazta – marketing
Dru-Ha – associate executive producer
Eli Evnen – marketing
Noah Friedman – project coordinator 
 
Shane Gill – marketing 
JFK – executive producer 
Bram Van Leuken – marketing 
Brandon "Bedlam" Matthews – marketing 
Mazza – marketing 
Kenneth Montgomery – legal counsel
J. Nicholson – promoter
Reuben Rodriguez-Robbins – marketing
Shucky Ducky – marketing 
Lou Smith – promoter 

Visuals and imagery

Deezy – creative director 
Dom Dirtee – photography 

Performance credits

Statik Selektah – primary artist
Pain In Da Ass – featured artist
Action Bronson – featured artist
Big Body Bes – featured artist
Termanology – featured artist
Tony Touch – featured artist
Raekwon – featured artist
Joey Badass – featured artist
Black Thought – featured artist
N.O.R.E. – featured artist
Lil Fame – featured artist
Sean Price – featured artist
Mac Miller – featured artist
Mike Posner – featured artist
Freddie Gibbs – featured artist
Easy Money – featured artist
Prodigy – featured artist
Styles P – featured artist
Bun B – featured artist
Hit-Boy – featured artist

Joell Ortiz – featured artist
Smif-n-Wessun – featured artist
Flatbush Zombies – featured artist
Troy Ave – featured artist
Push! – featured artist
Meyhem Lauren – featured artist
AG Da Coroner – featured artist
Wais P – featured artist
Slaine – featured artist
Blu – featured artist
Evidence – featured artist
Reks – featured artist
Freeway – featured artist
JFK – featured artist
Strong Arm Steady – featured artist
Pro Era – featured artist
Lecrae – featured artist
Posdnuos – featured artist
Talib Kweli – featured artist

Technical and production

Statik Selektah – producer
The Alchemist – producer

Charts

References

2013 albums
Statik Selektah albums
Albums produced by Statik Selektah
Albums produced by the Alchemist (musician)